Imerina is a genus of snout moths described by Émile Louis Ragonot in 1891.

Species
 Imerina mabillalis Ragonot, 1891
 Imerina saramitoi Guillermet in Viette & Guillermet, 1996

References

Pyralinae
Pyralidae genera
Taxa named by Émile Louis Ragonot